Francesco Maria Columbu (August 7, 1941 – August 30, 2019) was an Italian-American bodybuilder, powerlifter, actor, author, producer, and a licensed chiropractor.

Originally a boxer, Columbu won the Mr. Olympia in 1976 and 1981, and competed in the inaugural edition of the World's Strongest Man in 1977, where he placed fifth. He also had an acting career and authored numerous books on bodybuilding and nutrition. Columbu was inducted into the IFBB Hall of Fame in 2001, and received the Arnold Classic Lifetime Achievement Award in 2009.

Early life
Columbu was born on August 7, 1941, in Ollolai on the island of Sardinia, Italy. He was a son of shepherds Maria Grazia Sedda and Antonio Columbu. He said in 1982: "I was always skinny. Until I was 11, I got beat up a lot. Then one day, I started beating people up. Nobody could touch me." He worked as a shepherd while training as a boxer. He won over 30 fights as a boxer before quitting the sport in favor of weightlifting and bodybuilding, stating: "Boxing's too rough on your face and head."

Columbu moved to Germany at a young age for work, and met Arnold Schwarzenegger in 1965 at a bodybuilding competition in Stuttgart, Germany. Columbu formed a lifelong friendship with Schwarzenegger, and was Schwarzenegger's best man for his marriage to Maria Shriver in 1986 and godfather to their daughter Christina. Columbu and Schwarzenegger remained very close friends until Columbu's death, with Schwarzenegger stating in 2016 "He was my favourite training partner four decades ago and he is my favourite training partner today."

Athletic career
With Schwarzenegger, Columbu moved to California in the late 1960s to train and work with Joe Weider. Weider provided them with a place to live and an $80 per week stipend. The stipend was not enough to live on, so to support their bodybuilding careers, they began a bricklaying company named European Brick Works in 1969.

He won the lightweight class of the 1974 and 1975 IFBB Mr. Olympias, before winning the overall competition for the first time in 1976.

Columbu participated in the inaugural edition of the World's Strongest Man in 1977. During the event, he dislocated his left knee while carrying a refrigerator on his back. The injury kept him out of competition for a few years, and he received a reported $1 million (equivalent to $ million in ) in compensation. Columbu returned to win the 1981 Mr. Olympia then retired from competition.

He was named in The Guinness Book of Records in 1978 for bursting a hot water bottle by blowing into it, which he achieved in 55 seconds.

Acting, writing, directing, and producing careers
Columbu appeared as himself in the 1977 bodybuilding docudrama Pumping Iron. He was the body building coach for Sylvester Stallone in the film Rambo: First Blood Part II (1985), and had roles in films that starred Schwarzenegger, including Conan the Barbarian (1982), The Terminator (1984), and The Running Man (1987). In addition, Columbu's name appears during the opening credits of Schwarzenegger's Last Action Hero as the director of fictional film Jack Slater IV.

Columbu's later films, also as a writer and producer, included the cult film Beretta's Island, (1993), Doublecross on Costa's Island, which he also directed and Ancient Warriors (2003). These three films were almost entirely shot in his homeland of Sardinia.

Personal life and death
Columbu lived in Los Angeles since the 1970s. He was a licensed chiropractor, earning his degree from Cleveland Chiropractic College in 1977. Columbu returned to his hometown of Ollolai in Sardinia every year towards the end of August to attend the local festivities. Columbu became a naturalized citizen of the United States in 1983.

On August 30, 2019, after feeling unwell while swimming off the coast of San Teodoro, Sardinia, Columbu died during transportation by helicopter to a hospital in Olbia, twenty-three days after his 78th birthday. He was survived by his wife, Deborah, their daughter, Maria, and three sisters: Anna, Gonaria and Celestina. A funeral was held in his birthplace of Ollolai on September 3. A memorial was held in Los Angeles on October 6, 2019.

Filmography

Achievements

Bodybuilding titles

1970 IFBB Mr. World (Short)
1970 IFBB Mr. Universe (Short & Overall)
1971 IFBB Mr. World (Short & Overall)
1974 Mr. Olympia (Lightweight)
1975 Mr. Olympia (Lightweight)
1976 Mr. Olympia (Lightweight & Overall)
1981 Mr. Olympia

World's Strongest Man
1977, fifth place

Powerlifting records
 Bench press, 
 Squat, 
 Deadlift,

See also
List of male professional bodybuilders

References

Bibliography

External links
 

| colspan="3" style="text-align:center;"| Mr. Olympia

|-

1941 births
2019 deaths
Deaths by drowning
Italian bodybuilders
Italian emigrants to the United States
Italian people of Sardinian descent
Italian powerlifters
Italian strength athletes
Male powerlifters
People from the Province of Nuoro
Professional bodybuilders
Sportspeople from Sardinia